Prionopodella is a monotypic genus of centipedes in the family Scutigeridae. It is endemic to Australia, with the type locality being Colosseum in the Gladstone Region of Queensland. It was described by German myriapodologist Karl Wilhelm Verhoeff in 1925. Its sole species is Prionopodella pectinigera Verhoeff, 1925.

References

 

Scutigeridae
Centipede genera
Monotypic arthropod genera
Centipedes of Australia
Fauna of Queensland
Animals described in 1925
Taxa named by Karl Wilhelm Verhoeff